This is a list of events in British radio during 1985.

Events

January
 7 January – Ken Bruce takes over The Radio 2 Breakfast Show from Terry Wogan and David Jacobs moves from the Sunday morning host of Melodies for You to start a new weekday lunchtime programme consisting mainly of tracks from musical theatre called My Kind of Music.

February
 4 February – After broadcasting off and on since 1969, Radio Jackie's time as a pirate station ends. It returns 18 years later as a legal station, broadcasting to the same area of south west London that it had served as a pirate.
 13 February – Financial difficulties force South Wales station Gwent Broadcasting to close down after less than two years on air. Its frequencies are then given over to a simulcast of neighbouring station CBC.

March
31 March – Ranking Miss P becomes BBC Radio 1's first regular black female DJ when she begins presenting the station's first reggae programme. This is not her first appearance on the station, however, as she has been sitting in for other presenters for the past year.

April
No events.

May
No events.

June
 29 June – Study on 4 is renamed Options and from this date all of BBC Radio's adult educational programming is now broadcast on weekend afternoons. The programmes continue to be broadcast only on VHF/FM. This means that Radio 4's output on weeknights between 11 pm and 11.30 pm - ie all of The World Tonight and The Financial World Tonight - are now also broadcast on VHF/FM.

July
13 July – BBC Radio 1 broadcasts full, live coverage of the Live Aid pop concerts in stereo.

August
During the 1985 school summer holidays, BBC Radio 4 broadcasts an all-morning children's programme called Pirate Radio 4 on Thursday mornings. Three editions of the programme are aired. It is broadcast on VHF/FM only with the usual Radio 4 schedule continuing on long wave.

September
 3 September – The first changes to VHF/FM frequencies for ILR and BBC local radio take place with Pennine Radio in Huddersfield moving from 103.4 to 102.5 VHF. It is part of a European re-organisation of band 2 of the VHF band which comes into effect in July 1987 to allow the full broadcasting spectrum to be available for broadcasting.
 9 September – Following Wiltshire Radio's purchase of Radio West, Radio West closes at just after midnight.
 28 September – A Little Night Music is broadcast on BBC Radio 2 for the first time. Airing daily between 3 am and 4 am, it replaces repeats of programmes previous broadcast on Radio 2. Instead of having a regular or named host, the programme is presented by that night's newsreader.

October
 1 October – 
BBC Radio nan Gàidheal launches, replacing the Gaelic service  which covered north west Scotland and the Gaelic programming on BBC Radio Highland.
Radio Hallam's broadcast area is expanded when the Sheffield-based station starts broadcasting across all of South Yorkshire.
Following its purchase of Radio West, new owners Wiltshire Radio merge Radio West and Wiltshire Radio and launch a new 24-hour station, GWR FM with split programming for the two areas at breakfast and mid-morning. 
14 October – At 6am, CBC is relaunched as Red Dragon Radio and broadcasts a 24-hour schedule - CBC had previously closed down between 1am and 6am. The station also covers the Newport area, offering a replacement service to Gwent Broadcasting, and provides separate breakfast shows for Cardiff and Newport until the early 1990s. 
October – Plymouth Sound launches an opt-out service for Tavistock. The service operates on weekday breakfast and drive time and weekend mid-mornings.
October – Kiss makes its first broadcasts as a pirate station.

November
15 November – Radio Mercury's transmission area expands when it switches on a transmitter covering the Horsham area.

December
 29 December – BBC Radio 4 begins a 6-part dramatisation of Agatha Christie's novel The Mystery of the Blue Train, the first of a series of Hercule Poirot radio adaptations.

Unknown
The Independent Broadcasting Authority announces that Portsmouth station Radio Victory has lost its licence to a new consortium called Ocean Sound Ltd, which will broadcast to an enlarged area which also includes Southampton, Winchester and the Isle of Wight. This is the first time that the Authority decided not to renew the licence of an incumbent broadcaster.
Due to general difficulties within the commercial radio industry, Hereward Radio withdraws from Northamptonshire and the Independent Broadcasting Authority assigns the Independent Local Radio franchise to a new company, Northants Radio Ltd, owned by Chiltern Radio Group.
BBC Radio 1's London studios move to Egton House.

Station debuts
23 April – BBC Radio Shropshire
24 June – BBC Radio Bedfordshire
1 October – 
BBC Radio nan Gàidheal
GWR

Changes of station frequency

Closing this year
13 February – Gwent Broadcasting (1983–1985)
9 September – Radio West (1981–1985)
September – Wiltshire Radio (1982–1985)

Programme debuts
 2 February – Blandings on BBC Radio 4 (1985–1992)
 25 March – King Street Junior on BBC Radio 4 (1985–1998)
 17 April – After Henry on BBC Radio 4 (1985–1989)
 25 July – Pirate Radio Four on BBC Radio 4 (1985–1986)

Continuing radio programmes

1940s
 Sunday Half Hour (1940–2018)
 Desert Island Discs (1942–Present)
 Down Your Way (1946–1992)
 Letter from America (1946–2004)
 Woman's Hour (1946–Present)
 A Book at Bedtime (1949–Present)

1950s
 The Archers (1950–Present)
 The Today Programme (1957–Present)
 Sing Something Simple (1959–2001)
 Your Hundred Best Tunes (1959–2007)

1960s
 Farming Today (1960–Present)
 In Touch (1961–Present)
 The World at One (1965–Present)
 The Official Chart (1967–Present)
 Just a Minute (1967–Present)
 The Living World (1968–Present)
 The Organist Entertains (1969–2018)

1970s
 PM (1970–Present)
 Start the Week (1970–Present)
 Week Ending (1970–1998)
 You and Yours (1970–Present)
 I'm Sorry I Haven't a Clue (1972–Present)
 Good Morning Scotland (1973–Present)
 Kaleidoscope (1973–1998)
 Newsbeat (1973–Present)
 The News Huddlines (1975–2001)
 File on 4 (1977–Present)
 Money Box (1977–Present)
 The News Quiz (1977–Present)
 Breakaway (1979–1998)
 Feedback (1979–Present)
 The Food Programme (1979–Present)
 Science in Action (1979–Present)

1980s
 Radio Active (1980–1987)
 In Business (1983–Present)
 Sounds of the 60s (1983–Present)
 Delve Special (1984–1987)

Births
 5 February – Emma Barnett, broadcast presenter and journalist
 22 February – Toddla T (Thomas Bell), DJ
 19 March – Gemma Cairney, radio presenter and fashion stylist
 17 December – Greg James, DJ
 27 December – Matt Edmondson, broadcast music presenter
 DJ Q (Shollen Quarshie), DJ

Deaths
9 May – Reginald Dixon, 80, theatre organist
28 May – Roy Plomley, 71, creator and presenter of Desert Island Discs
24 June – Valentine Dyall, 77, character actor
6 November – Hans Keller, 66, musicologist
23 November – Leslie Mitchell, 80, announcer
30 December – Bob Pearson, 78, singer and pianist (part of Bob and Alf Pearson double act)

See also 
 1985 in British music
 1985 in British television
 1985 in the United Kingdom
 List of British films of 1985

References

Radio
British Radio, 1985 In
Years in British radio